Haim Shapira is an Israeli mathematician, pianist, speaker, philosopher and game theorist. He writes in Hebrew, and his books have been translated into English, Spanish, German, Portuguese, Italian, Russian, Bengali and Korean. He is one of the most sought-after lecturers in Israel, and was also a keynote speaker at TEDxJaffa on game theory and strategy. His first two books in English are Happiness and Other Small Things of Absolute Importance and Gladiators, Pirates and Games of Trust. He also arranged and performed music on the soundtrack for John Wick: Chapter 2.

Haim Shapira was born in Vilnius, Lithuania in 1962 and immigrated to Israel at the age of 14 in 1977.

Education

Haim Shapira holds a Bachelor of Science degree in Theoretical Mathematics (1983–1987) and a Master of Science degree in Probability and Statistics (1987–1991), both from the School of Mathematical and Computer Sciences, Tel Aviv University.

He earned a PhD in Mathematical Genetics from Tel Aviv University in 1995 ("The 'Volunteer's Dilemma' as a Generalized War of Attrition", 1996). He also holds a PhD in Science Education from Tel Aviv University ("Development of intuition regarding the concept infinity in various fields of mathematics").

Current position

Haim Shapira was a lecturer at Tel Aviv University from 1994 to 2000.

He is currently a senior lecturer at The College of Management Academic Studies in Rishon LeZion, Israel. He is Head of the Excellent Students Program and lecturer at the School of Economics and at the School of Behavioral Sciences.

His main research areas are game theory and philosophy. In 2016 he taught game theory and statistics.

Publications

Books in Hebrew
2006 Following Alice – Travels in the world of Lewis Carroll, The Broadcast University Press, Ministry of Defense.
2008 Conversations on Game Theory, Kinneret, Zmora‐Bitan.
2009 Things That Matter, Kinneret, Zmora‐Bitan.
2010 The Infinite: Never-ending journey, Kinneret, Zmora‐Bitan.
2011 Ecclesiastes – The Biblical Philosopher, Kinneret, Zmora‐Bitan.
2013 Nocturnal Musings: Kierkegaard, Schopenhauer, Nietzsche, Kinneret, Zmora‐Bitan.
2014 The Book of Love, Kinneret, Zmora‐Bitan.
2015 I think, therefore I err, Kinneret, Zmora‐Bitan.

Books in english
2016 Happiness and Other Small Things of Absolute Importance, Watkins Publishing.
2017 Gladiators, Pirates and Games of Trust: How Game Theory, Strategy and Probability Rule Our Lives, Watkins Publishing.
2019 Eight Lessons on Infinity: A Mathematical Adventure, Watkins Publishing.

References

External links
Haim Shapira plays the piano (His YouTube channel)

Living people
Israeli mathematicians
Israeli writers
Year of birth missing (living people)